Enakta Leiringei (English: When You're Near Me) is a 2017 Indian Meitei language film directed by Manoranjan Longjam. It stars Kaiku Rajkumar and Soma Laishram in the lead roles. Enakta Leiringei got Best Feature Film award at the 11th Manipur State Film Awards 2018. It was released at Manipur State Film Development Society (MSFDS), Palace Compound, on 28 October 2017. It had its regular theatrical screenings at Usha Cinema, Paona Bazar in July 2018.

Synopsis
Khaba and Thoinu met on their journey to Jiribam, and the series of events that followed during the journey changed their lives forever.

Cast
 Kaiku Rajkumar as Khaba
 Soma Laishram as Thoinu
 Redy Yumnam as Thoinu's love interest
 Leishangthem Rahul
 Narmada Sougaijam
 Ningthoujam Rina as Thoinu's Mother
 Oinam Gyaneshori
 Devita Urikhinbam as Khaba's sister-in-law (Guest Appearance)

Production
The role of Khaba in the film was initially offered to Gurumayum Bonny, but due to his tight schedule, he rejected the offer. The shooting of the film took more than a year to complete due to certain social and political issues in Manipur.

Promotions
Enakta Leiringei was promoted in the Saturday Night Show of Manung Hutna, Impact TV, hosted by Raj Nongthombam on 23 September 2017, ahead of its release at MSFDS, Imphal.

Accolades
Enakta Leiringei won many awards at the 11th Manipur State Film Awards 2018, including the Best Feature Film award.

Soundtrack
Jimbo Ningombam composed the soundtrack for the film and Anil Longjam, M. K. Binodini Devi and Jimbo Ningombam wrote the lyrics. The songs are titled Enakta Leiringei, Karamba Jugki and Etaa.

References

External links
 

2010s Meitei-language films
2017 films